Joseph Maria Friedrich von Radowitz (19 May 1839 – 15 January 1912) was a German diplomat who served as acting Foreign Secretary and head of the Foreign Office from 6 November 1879 until 17 April 1880.

Biography  
Radowitz was born in Frankfurt am Main, the son of Prussian statesman Joseph von Radowitz. He joined the diplomatic service of Prussia in 1860, and was stationed in Constantinople, China and Japan until 1865. Upon his return to Europe, he was stationed in Paris. During the Austro-Prussian War, he served as aide-de-camp to Prince Frederick Charles of Prussia, and was subsequently attached to the Prussian diplomatic mission in Munich (Kingdom of Bavaria). He became Consul General of the North German Confederation to Bucharest in 1870 and a member of the European Donau Commission. In 1872, he was appointed as chargé d'affaires to Constantinople, before he became Director for Oriental Affairs at the Foreign Office. He was appointed as Envoy to Athens in 1874, but remained in Berlin. In 1875, he became acting Ambassador to St. Petersburg, where he offered Russia German support for Russian interests in the Balkans in exchange for Russian support for German interests in Western Europe. In 1878 he took part at the Congress of Berlin.

After the death of Bernhard Ernst von Bülow, Radowitz was appointed as acting Foreign Secretary, until he was succeeded by Chlodwig, Prince of Hohenlohe-Schillingsfürst.

He became Ambassador to Constantinople in October 1882 and Ambassador to Madrid in 1892. He died in Berlin.

Orders and decorations
  Kingdom of Prussia:
 Landwehr Service Medal, 1st Class
 Knight of the Order of the Red Eagle, 4th Class with Swords, 1866; 2nd Class with Oak Leaves and Swords on Ring, 1877; with Star, 5 December 1878; Grand Cross with Crown and in Diamonds
 Knight of the Royal Order of the Crown, 1st Class, 18 January 1886
 : Grand Cross of the Merit Order of Saint Michael, 1881
  Mecklenburg: Grand Cross of the House Order of the Wendish Crown, with Golden Crown
 : Grand Cross of the Albert Order, with Golden Star
 : Knight of the Imperial Order of the Iron Crown, 1st Class
 :
 Gold Imtiaz Medal
 Order of Osmanieh, 1st Class in Diamonds
 Order of the Medjidie, 1st Class in Diamonds
 : Grand Cross of the Order of the Star of Romania
 : Grand Cross of the Royal and Distinguished Order of Charles III

Literature 
Hajo Holborn (ed.): Aufzeichnungen und Erinnerungen aus dem Leben des Botschafters Joseph Maria von Radowitz. Deutsche Verlagsanstalt, Stuttgart/Berlin/Leipzig 1925.

References

External links 

1839 births
1912 deaths
People from Frankfurt
Foreign Secretaries of Germany
Ambassadors of Germany to Turkey
Ambassadors of Germany to Spain
Ambassadors of Germany to Russia
Ambassadors of Germany to France
Ambassadors of Germany to Greece
Recipients of the Order of the Medjidie, 1st class
Grand Crosses of the Order of the Star of Romania